Lodovico Espinosa (28 April 1926 – 28 February 2006) was a Filipino sports shooter. He competed in two events at the 1972 Summer Olympics.

References

External links
 

1926 births
2006 deaths
Filipino male sport shooters
Olympic shooters of the Philippines
Shooters at the 1972 Summer Olympics
Place of birth missing
Asian Games medalists in shooting
Shooters at the 1966 Asian Games
Asian Games silver medalists for the Philippines
Asian Games bronze medalists for the Philippines
Medalists at the 1966 Asian Games